Patton is an unincorporated community in Jefferson Township, Carroll County, Indiana.

History
A post office was established at Patton in 1880, and remained in operation until it was discontinued in 1913. The community was named for its founder, H. Patton.

Patton was located on the Monon Railroad.

Geography

References

Unincorporated communities in Carroll County, Indiana
Unincorporated communities in Indiana